Wilhelm August van der Osten (7 January 1697 – 15 January 1764) was a Danish civil servant.

Early life

Wilhelm August von der Osten was born in Copenhagen, the son of lord chamberlain  Peter Christoph van der Osten (1659–1730) and Louise Benedicte von Reichow (1670–1755).  He attended Sorø Academy.

Career
He began his career as squire for queen Anna Sophie. He then served as the leader of the Bergenhus stiftamt (stiftsbefalingsmand) in Bergen and also the Bergenhus county governor (amtmand) from 1728 to 1732.

In 1735, he was appointed to district governor of Sorø County as well as director of Sorø Abbey. He was involved in the revival of Sorø Academy. From 1738 he also served as director of Øresund Custom House.

In 1843, he left Sorø to assume a position as director of the financial administration in Copenhagen and was also appointed as member of the treasury (rentekammeret). He vigorously advocated a limitation of state expenditure, leading to the establishment of a commission consisting of J. L. Holstein, C. A. Berckentin, J. S. Schulin and van der Osten that was to propose budget cuts. Their proposals were approved by the king but never executed, as a result of his death. Osten was dismissed as director of the financial administration by the new king but kept his post as director of Øresund Custom House until his death.

Awards and honours
Osten was appointed to Gehejmeråd in  1744 and Gehejmekonferensråd in  1755. He became a Knight of the Order of the Dannebrog om 1740 and a Knight of the Order of the Elephant in 1763. He received the Ordre de l'Union Parfaite in 1752.

Personal life
Van der Osten married twice. His first wife was Charlotte Amalie Lützow (ft. 30.7.1696 - 12 May1743), a daughter of colonel Frederik Lützow of Lundsgård and Gammelgård (c. 1657-1710) and Dorothea Magdalene von Harstall (1677-1743). His second wife was Friederike Anna Sophie von Massow (ca. 1725 - 1750), a daughter of district governor (amtmand) Christian Albrecht von Massow (c. 1690 - 1752) and Marsilia von Grabow.

Van der Osten constructed one of the first town mansions in the new Frederiksstaden district in Copenhagen. The building is now known as the Prince William Mansion, Copenhagen after a later owner.

References

Danish civil servants
1697 births
1764 deaths
Danish Customs Service personnel